Hickman Row is a set of historic rowhouses and national historic district located at Claymont, New Castle County, Delaware. It encompasses 24 contributing buildings and 1 contributing structure. It was built about 1919 and consists of two blocks of row houses constructed by the Worth Steel Corporation to house their African American workforce. Each brick rowhouse has approximately 1,350 square feet with three bedrooms and one bathroom. The houses were sold to individuals by the Colorado Fuel and Iron Corporation in 1962–1963.

It was listed on the National Register of Historic Places in 2006.

References

African-American historic places
Houses on the National Register of Historic Places in Delaware
Historic districts on the National Register of Historic Places in Delaware
Houses completed in 1919
Houses in New Castle County, Delaware
National Register of Historic Places in New Castle County, Delaware